Sa Re Ga Ma Pa The Next Singing ICON is the 13th season of Indian Telugu-language musical/singing reality television show Sa Re Ga Ma Pa. It started airing on Zee Telugu from 23 August 2020 and also digitally available on ZEE5. Kondepudi Yasaswi is the winner of the show.

Production 
It started on 23 August 2020 with Pradeep Machiraju as the host. The show is directed by Shashi Kiran Goud and judged by Koti, S. P. Sailaja and Chandrabose. The final episode was aired on 21 March 2021.

Judges 

 Koti
 S. P. Sailaja
 Chandrabose
 Kalpana Raghavendar (Episodes 6 & 7; final episode special judge)
 Sunitha Upadrashta (final episode special judge)

Jury 

 Damini Bhatla
 Deepu
 Harika Narayan
 L. V. Revanth
 Prudhvi Chandra
 Raghuram
 Saketh
 Soni
Sandeep

Guests

Contestants 
Kondepudi Yasaswi (Winner)

 Bharat Raj (Runner-Up)
 Pavan Kalyan (Second Runner-Up)
 Venkata Chaitanya  (Finalist)
 Pragna Nayani (Finalist)
 Ananya Bhaskar
 Abhilash Anand Katta
 Teja
 Lakshmi Gayathri
 Balaji
 Swapnika Kosuru
 Yuti Harshavardhana
 Sai Priya
 Ganesh
 Rana
 Sai Sameera
 Vikram
 Prathima Korada
 Rajeshwari

Eliminations

See also 

 Zee Telugu
 Zee Cine Awards Telugu

References

External links 

 Sa Re Ga Ma Pa The Next Singing ICON at ZEE5
 

Zee Telugu original programming
Telugu-language television shows
Indian reality television series
Singing competitions
Singing talent shows
Sa Re Ga Ma Pa
2021 Indian television seasons
2020 Indian television seasons